Marquess of Loulé (in Portuguese Marquês de Loulé) is a Portuguese title granted by royal decree of Queen Maria I of Portugal, dated from July 6, 1799, to Dom Agostinho Domingos José de Mendoça Rolim de Moura Barreto (1780-1824), who already was 8th Count of Vale de Reis.

This title was later inherited by his son, Nuno José Severo de Mendoça Rolim de Moura Barreto, who married Infanta Ana de Jesus Maria, King John VI younger daughter.

Family Name
The family name associated with the House of Loulé is  de Mendoça Rolim de Moura Barreto.

List of the Marquesses of Loulé
Agostinho Domingos José de Mendoça Rolim de Moura Barreto (1780-1824), 8th Count of Vale de Reis; 
Nuno José Severo de Mendoça Rolim de Moura Barreto (1804 - 1875), 9th Count of Vale de Reis, who became 1st Duke of Loulé in 1862.

(for the list of holders after this date see Duke of Loulé)

Other Titles
The family also holds the title of Count of Vale de Reis, granted by decree of King Philip III of Portugal (also known as Philip IV of Spain) dated from August 16, 1628.

See also
Dukedoms in Portugal
List of marquisates in Portugal
List of prime ministers of Portugal

External links
 Genealogy of the Marquesses of Loulé, in Portuguese

Loule
Loulé